Adrian Keith (born 16 December 1962) is an English former footballer who played as a defender for Colchester United in the Football League.

Career
Keith started with West Ham United as an apprentice in their youth squad and was a member of the team which won the 1981 Youth Cup. Without making a first team appearance for West Ham he moved to Colchester United in 1983 but played only four games, all of them in January 1983. After leaving Colchester United Keith moved to non league football with Haverill Rovers.

Honours

Club
West Ham United
 FA Youth Cup winner: 1980–81

References

1962 births
Living people
West Ham United F.C. players
Colchester United F.C. players
Haverhill Rovers F.C. players
English Football League players
Sportspeople from Colchester
Association football defenders
English footballers